Saurabh Dalal (born 28 August 1958) is an Indian politician in the Indian state of Gujarat.

He was serving from  2017 to 2022 as a Member of Legislative Assembly in the 14th Gujarat Legislative Assembly or Gujarat Vidhan Sabha (ગુજરાત વિધાન સભા) and has served in the same capacity in the 10th, 11th, 12th and 13th Legislative Assemblies as well. In the Gujarat Legislative Assembly Elections that concluded in 2017, he contested and was directly elected from the constituency of Botad. He was the minister of Energy & Petrochemicals for 14 Years.

He holds a MBA degree from the United States of America.

He is the son-in-law of the Ambani's family. Saurabh Dalal Patel belongs to Patel community but has surname of Dalal due to the profession of his forefathers. He is known as the Patel of Ambani family.

Personal
Saurabh Dalal Patel is the husband of Ila Ambani, the first cousin of Mukesh and Anil Ambani. He is the son-in-law of Ramnikbhai Ambani, the elder brother of late Dhirubhai Ambani.

Political
Interested in the energy fields, Saurabh has succeeded in making an energy negative building in Gandhinagar. Asia's biggest solar power project is also his brainchild, as well as a pilot project of rooftop solar panels on Narmada Canal.

References

Living people
State cabinet ministers of Gujarat
1958 births
Gujarat MLAs 1998–2002
Gujarat MLAs 2002–2007
Gujarat MLAs 2007–2012
Gujarat MLAs 2012–2017
Bharatiya Janata Party politicians from Gujarat
Gujarat MLAs 2017–2022
Gujarati people